Triphragmium ulmariae is a species of rust fungus in the family Sphaerophragmiaceae. It causes meadowsweet rust gall, which develops as a chemically induced swelling, arising from the lower surface of the meadowsweet (Filipendula ulmaria) leaves.

Life cycle
The fungus grows in the petioles and/or midribs of the perennial plant meadowsweet (Filipendula ulmaria), a member of the rose family, causing swelling and distortion. Sori develop with bright orange spores. The rust's spores reach the new meadowsweet plants via air movements.

The rust has a severe effect on the survival of meadowsweet seedlings.

References

Pucciniales
Galls
Fungi described in 1808